Zajas is a former municipality in western North Macedonia, created in the 1996 territorial organisation, dissolved following 2013 Macedonian new territorial organisation after it was merged with Kičevo Municipality.
 Zajas is also the name of the village where the municipal seat was found.
 Zajas Municipality was part of the Southwestern Statistical Region.

Geography
The municipality bordered
Mavrovo and Rostuša Municipality to the west,
Gostivar Municipality to the northeast,
Oslomej Municipality to the east,
Kičevo Municipality to the southeast, and
Drugovo Municipality to the southwest.

Demographics

According to the last national census from 2002, this municipality has 11,605 inhabitants.
Ethnic groups in the municipality include:
Albanians = 11,308 (97.4%)
Macedonians = 211 (1.8%)
others = 86 (0.7%)

The total number of students in the municipality in 2011, in comparison to the total number of students in 2007, declined for 35.5%. Zajas is the second municipality in North Macedonia by the decline of the total number of students.

References

Former municipalities of North Macedonia
Kičevo Municipality